The Serbian Ambassador in Beijing is the official representative of the Government of in Belgrade to the Government of the People's Republic of China. He is Non-Resident Ambassador in Pyongyang (North Korea), Ulaanbaatar (Mongolia) and Islamabad (Pakistan).

List of representatives

China–Serbia relations

References 

Ambassadors of Serbia to China
China
Serbia